The 2020 Baseball5 European Championship was an international baseball5 tournament organized by the WBSC Europe. The championship was held from 28 February to 1 March 2020, in Vilnius, Lithuania and was contested between 14 national teams.

France won the tournament, beating Lithuania in the final 2 matches to 0. Russia finished third defeating Italy 2 matches to 0 in the Bronze medal game.

Venues

Round 1

Pool A

Standings

Pool B

Standings

Play-offs

Final standings

References

External links 
 Official website
 Video footage of all games

2020
Baseball5 European Championship
Baseball5 European Championship
Sports competitions in Vilnius
International sports competitions hosted by Lithuania
Baseball5 European Championship
Baseball5 European Championship
Baseball competitions in Lithuania